The Herd may refer to:

Film and radio 
 The Herd (1978 film), a 1978 Turkish film
 The Herd (1998 film), a 1998 Canadian film
 The Herd with Colin Cowherd, an FS1 and Fox Sports Radio program

Music 
 The Herd (Australian band), a hip-hop group from the suburbs of Sydney, Australia
 The Herd (The Herd album), 2001
 The Herd (British band), the 1960s UK band that launched Peter Frampton's career
 The Herd (Wipers album), 1996

Sports
Marshall Thundering Herd
 "The Herd", a nickname of the Buffalo Bisons baseball team
 The Herd (hooligan firm), a group of English football hooligans associated with Arsenal F.C.

Other 
 "The Herd", a Vietnam War-era nickname of United States Army 173rd Airborne Brigade Combat Team
 "the herd", a commonly used phrase in the book The Philosophy of Friedrich Nietzsche (1907) by H. L. Mencken
 Herd of Sheffield, a public art trail in Sheffield, UK

See also
 Herd (disambiguation)
 Herding